The following is a list of people executed by the U.S. state of Texas between 1900 and 1909. During this period 71 people were executed by hanging.

Executions 1900–1909

See also
Capital punishment in Texas

References

1900
20th-century executions by Texas
1900s-related lists
1900s in Texas